

Events

Pre-1600
585 BC – A solar eclipse occurs, as predicted by the Greek philosopher and scientist Thales, while Alyattes is battling Cyaxares in the Battle of the Eclipse, leading to a truce. This is one of the cardinal dates from which other dates can be calculated.
 621 – Battle of Hulao: Li Shimin, the son of the Chinese emperor Gaozu, defeats the numerically superior forces of Dou Jiande near the Hulao Pass (Henan). This victory decides the outcome of the civil war that followed the Sui dynasty's collapse in favour of the Tang dynasty.
1533 – The Archbishop of Canterbury, Thomas Cranmer, declares the marriage of King Henry VIII of England to Anne Boleyn valid.
1588 – The Spanish Armada, with 130 ships and 30,000 men, sets sail from Lisbon, Portugal, heading for the English Channel. (It will take until May 30 for all ships to leave port.)

1601–1900
1644 – English Civil War: Bolton Massacre by Royalist troops under the command of James Stanley, 7th Earl of Derby.
1754 – French and Indian War: In the first engagement of the war, Virginia militia under the 22-year-old Lieutenant colonel George Washington defeat a French reconnaissance party in the Battle of Jumonville Glen in what is now Fayette County in southwestern Pennsylvania.
1802 – In Guadeloupe, 400 rebellious slaves, led by Louis Delgrès, blow themselves up rather than submit to Napoleon's troops.
1830 – U.S. President Andrew Jackson signs the Indian Removal Act which denies Native Americans their land rights and forcibly relocates them.
1871 – The Paris Commune falls after two months.
1892 – In San Francisco, John Muir organizes the Sierra Club.

1901–present
1905 – Russo-Japanese War: The Battle of Tsushima ends with the destruction of the Russian Baltic Fleet by Admiral Tōgō Heihachirō and the Imperial Japanese Navy.
1907 – The first Isle of Man TT race is held.
1918 – The Azerbaijan Democratic Republic and the First Republic of Armenia declare their independence.
1926 – The 28 May 1926 coup d'état: Ditadura Nacional is established in Portugal to suppress the unrest of the First Republic.
1932 – In the Netherlands, construction of the Afsluitdijk is completed and the Zuiderzee bay is converted to the freshwater IJsselmeer.
1934 – Near Callander, Ontario, Canada, the Dionne quintuplets are born to Oliva and Elzire Dionne; they will be the first quintuplets to survive infancy.
1936 – Alan Turing submits On Computable Numbers for publication.
1937 – Volkswagen, the German automobile manufacturer, is founded.
1940 – World War II: Belgium surrenders to Nazi Germany to end the Battle of Belgium.
  1940   – World War II: Norwegian, French, Polish and British forces recapture Narvik in Norway. This is the first Allied infantry victory of the War.
1948 – Daniel François Malan is elected as Prime Minister of South Africa. He later goes on to implement Apartheid.
1958 – Cuban Revolution: Fidel Castro's 26th of July Movement, heavily reinforced by Frank Pais Militia, overwhelm an army post in El Uvero.
1961 – Peter Benenson's article The Forgotten Prisoners is published in several internationally read newspapers. This will later be thought of as the founding of the human rights organization Amnesty International.
1964 – The Palestine Liberation Organization (PLO) is founded, with Yasser Arafat elected as its first leader.
1968 – Garuda Indonesia Flight 892 crashes near Nala Sopara in India, killing 30.
1974 – Northern Ireland's power-sharing Sunningdale Agreement collapses following a general strike by loyalists.
1975 – Fifteen West African countries sign the Treaty of Lagos, creating the Economic Community of West African States.
1977 – In Southgate, Kentucky, the Beverly Hills Supper Club is engulfed in fire, killing 165 people inside.
1979 – Konstantinos Karamanlis signs the full treaty of the accession of Greece with the European Economic Community.
1987 – An 18-year-old West German pilot, Mathias Rust, evades Soviet Union air defences and lands a private plane in Red Square in Moscow, Russia.
1991 – The capital city of Addis Ababa falls to the Ethiopian People's Revolutionary Democratic Front, ending both the Derg regime in Ethiopia and the Ethiopian Civil War.
1995 – The 7.0  Neftegorsk earthquake shakes the former Russian settlement of Neftegorsk with a maximum Mercalli intensity of IX (Violent). Total damage was $64.1–300 million, with 1,989 deaths and 750 injured. The settlement was not rebuilt.
1996 – U.S. President Bill Clinton's former business partners in the Whitewater land deal, Jim McDougal and Susan McDougal, and the Governor of Arkansas, Jim Guy Tucker, are convicted of fraud.
1998 – Nuclear testing: Pakistan responds to a series of nuclear tests by India with five of its own codenamed Chagai-I, prompting the United States, Japan, and other nations to impose economic sanctions. Pakistan celebrates Youm-e-Takbir annually.
1999 – In Milan, Italy, after 22 years of restoration work, Leonardo da Vinci's masterpiece The Last Supper is put back on display.
2002 – The last steel girder is removed from the original World Trade Center site. Cleanup duties officially end with closing ceremonies at Ground Zero in Manhattan, New York City.  
2003 – Peter Hollingworth resigns as Governor-General of Australia following criticism of his handling of child sexual abuse allegations during his tenure as Anglican Archbishop of Brisbane.
2004 – The Iraqi Governing Council chooses Ayad Allawi, a longtime anti-Saddam Hussein exile, as prime minister of Iraq's interim government.
2008 – The first meeting of the Constituent Assembly of Nepal formally declares Nepal a republic, ending the 240-year reign of the Shah dynasty.
2010 – In West Bengal, India, the Jnaneswari Express train derailment and subsequent collision kills 148 passengers.
2011 – Malta votes on the introduction of divorce; the proposal was approved by 53% of voters, resulting in a law allowing divorce under certain conditions being enacted later in the year.
2016 – Harambe, a gorilla, is shot to death after grabbing a three-year-old boy in his enclosure at the Cincinnati Zoo and Botanical Garden, resulting in widespread criticism and sparking various internet memes.
2017 – Former Formula One driver Takuma Sato wins his first Indianapolis 500, the first Japanese and Asian driver to do so. Double world champion Fernando Alonso retires from an engine issue in his first entry of the event.

Births

Pre-1600
1140 – Xin Qiji, Chinese poet, general, and politician (d. 1207)
1371 – John the Fearless, Duke of Burgundy (d. 1419)
1588 – Pierre Séguier, French politician, Lord Chancellor of France (d. 1672)
1589 – Robert Arnauld d'Andilly, French writer (d. 1674)

1601–1900
1663 – António Manoel de Vilhena, Grand Master of the Order of Saint John (d. 1736)
1676 – Jacopo Riccati, Italian mathematician and academic (d. 1754)
1692 – Geminiano Giacomelli, Italian composer (d. 1740)
1738 – Joseph-Ignace Guillotin, French physician (d. 1814)
1759 – William Pitt the Younger, English lawyer and politician, Prime Minister of the United Kingdom (d. 1806)
1763 – Manuel Alberti, Argentinian priest and journalist (d. 1811)
1764 – Edward Livingston, American jurist and politician, 11th United States Secretary of State (d. 1836)
1779 – Thomas Moore, Irish poet and composer (d. 1852)
1807 – Louis Agassiz, Swiss-American paleontologist and geologist (d. 1873)
1818 – P. G. T. Beauregard, American general (d. 1893)
1836 – Friedrich Baumfelder, German pianist, composer, and conductor (d. 1916)
  1836   – Alexander Mitscherlich, German chemist and academic (d. 1918)
1837 – George Ashlin, Irish architect, co-designed St Colman's Cathedral (d. 1921)
  1837   – Tony Pastor, American impresario, variety performer and theatre owner (d. 1908)
1841 – Sakaigawa Namiemon, Japanese sumo wrestler, the 14th Yokozuna (d. 1887)
1853 – Carl Larsson, Swedish painter and author (d. 1919)
1858 – Carl Richard Nyberg, Swedish inventor and businessman, developed the blow torch (d. 1939)
1872 – Marian Smoluchowski, Polish physicist and mountaineer (d. 1917)
1878 – Paul Pelliot, French sinologist and explorer (d. 1945)
1879 – Milutin Milanković, Serbian mathematician, astronomer, and geophysicist (d. 1958)
1883 – Vinayak Damodar Savarkar, Indian poet and politician (d. 1966)
  1883   – Clough Williams-Ellis, English-Welsh architect, designed the Portmeirion Village (d. 1978)
1884 – Edvard Beneš, Czech academic and politician, 2nd and 4th President of Czechoslovakia (d. 1948)
1886 – Santo Trafficante, Sr., Italian-American mobster (d. 1954)
1888 – Kaarel Eenpalu, Estonian journalist and politician, 6th Prime Minister of Estonia (d. 1942)
  1888   – Vivienne Haigh-Wood Eliot, English author and educator (d. 1947)
  1888   – Jim Thorpe, American decathlete, football player, and coach (d. 1953)
1889 – Richard Réti, Slovak-Czech chess player and author (d. 1929)
1892 – Minna Gombell, American actress (d. 1973)
1900 – Tommy Ladnier, American trumpet player (d. 1939)

1901–present
1903 – S. L. Kirloskar, Indian businessman, founded Kirloskar Group (d. 1994)
1906 – Henry Thambiah, Sri Lankan lawyer, judge, and diplomat, Sri Lankan High Commissioner to Canada (d. 1997)
1908 – Léo Cadieux, Canadian journalist and politician, 17th Canadian Minister of National Defence (d. 2005)
  1908   – Ian Fleming, English journalist and author, created James Bond (d. 1964)
1909 – Red Horner, Canadian ice hockey player (d. 2005)
1910 – Georg Gaßmann, German politician, Mayor of Marburg (d. 1987)
  1910   – Rachel Kempson, English actress (d. 2003)
  1910   – T-Bone Walker, American singer-songwriter and guitarist (d. 1975)
1911 – Bob Crisp, South African cricketer (d. 1994)
  1911   – Thora Hird, English actress (d. 2003)
  1911   – Fritz Hochwälder, Austrian playwright (d. 1986)
1912 – Herman Johannes, Indonesian scientist, academic, and politician (d. 1992)
  1912   – Ruby Payne-Scott, Australian physicist and astronomer (d. 1981)
  1912   – Patrick White, Australian novelist, poet, and playwright, Nobel Prize laureate (d. 1990)
1914 – W. G. G. Duncan Smith, English captain and pilot (d. 1996)
1915 – Joseph Greenberg, American linguist and academic (d. 2001)
1916 – Walker Percy, American novelist and essayist (d. 1990)
1917 – Barry Commoner, American biologist, academic, and politician (d. 2012)
1918 – Johnny Wayne, Canadian comedian (d. 1990) 
1921 – D. V. Paluskar, Indian Hindustani classical musician (d. 1955)
  1921   – Heinz G. Konsalik, German journalist and author (d. 1999)
  1921   – Tom Uren, Australian soldier, boxer, and politician (d. 2015)
1922 – Lou Duva, American boxer, trainer, and manager (d. 2017)
  1922   – Roger Fisher, American author and academic (d. 2012)
  1922   – Tuomas Gerdt, Finnish soldier (d. 2020)
1923 – György Ligeti, Hungarian-Austrian composer and educator (d. 2006)
  1923   – N. T. Rama Rao, Indian actor, director, producer, and politician, 10th Chief Minister of Andhra Pradesh (d. 1996)
1924 – Edward du Cann, English naval officer and politician (d. 2017)
  1924   – Paul Hébert, Canadian actor (d. 2017)
1925 – Bülent Ecevit, Turkish journalist, scholar, and politician, 16th Prime Minister of Turkey (d. 2006)
  1925   – Dietrich Fischer-Dieskau, German opera singer and conductor (d. 2012)
1928 – Sally Forrest, American actress and dancer (d. 2015)
1929 – Patrick McNair-Wilson, English politician
1930 – Edward Seaga, American-Jamaican academic and politician, 5th Prime Minister of Jamaica (d. 2019)
1931 – Carroll Baker, American actress
  1931   – Gordon Willis, American cinematographer (d. 2014)
1932 – Tim Renton, Baron Renton of Mount Harry, English politician, Minister for Culture, Communications and Creative Industries (d. 2020)
1933 – John Karlen, American actor (d. 2020)
  1933   – Zelda Rubinstein, American actress and activist (d. 2010)
1936 – Claude Forget, Canadian academic and politician
  1936   – Ole K. Sara, Norwegian politician (d. 2013)
  1936   – Betty Shabazz, American educator and activist (d. 1997)
1938 – Jerry West, American basketball player, coach, and executive
1939 – Maeve Binchy, Irish novelist (d. 2012)
1940 – David William Brewer, English politician, Lord-Lieutenant of Greater London
  1940   – Shlomo Riskin, American rabbi and academic, founded the Lincoln Square Synagogue
1941 – Beth Howland, American actress and singer (d. 2015)
1942 – Stanley B. Prusiner, American neurologist and biochemist, Nobel Prize laureate
1943 – Terry Crisp, Canadian ice hockey player and coach
1944 – Faith Brown, English actress and singer
  1944   – Rudy Giuliani, American lawyer and politician, 107th mayor of New York City
  1944   – Gladys Knight, American singer-songwriter and actress
  1944   – Sondra Locke, American actress and director (d. 2018)
  1944   – Rita MacNeil, Canadian singer and actress (d. 2013)
  1944   – Gary Stewart, American singer-songwriter (d. 2003)
  1944   – Billy Vera, American singer-songwriter and actor
1945 – Patch Adams, American physician and author, founded the Gesundheit! Institute
  1945   – John N. Bambacus, American military veteran (USMC) and politician
  1945   – John Fogerty, American singer-songwriter, guitarist, and producer 
  1945   – Jean Perrault, Canadian politician, Mayor of Sherbrooke, Quebec
  1945   – Helena Shovelton, English physician
1946 – Bruce Alexander, English actor
  1946   – Skip Jutze, American baseball player
  1946   – Janet Paraskeva, Welsh politician
  1946   – K. Satchidanandan, Indian poet and critic
  1946   – William Shawcross, English journalist and author
1947 – Zahi Hawass, Egyptian archaeologist and academic
  1947   – Lynn Johnston, Canadian author and illustrator
  1947   – Leland Sklar, American singer-songwriter and bass player
1948 – Michael Field, Australian politician, 38th Premier of Tasmania 
  1948   – Pierre Rapsat, Belgian singer and songwriter (d. 2002)
1949 – Martin Kelner, English journalist, author, comedian, singer, actor and radio presenter
  1949   – Wendy O. Williams, American singer-songwriter, musician, and actress (d. 1998)
1952 – Roger Briggs, American pianist, composer, conductor, and educator
1953 – Pierre Gauthier, Canadian ice hockey player and manager
1954 – João Carlos de Oliveira, Brazilian jumper (d. 1999)
  1954   – Youri Egorov, Russian pianist and composer (d. 1988)
  1954   – Charles Saumarez Smith, English historian and academic
  1954   – Péter Szilágyi, Hungarian conductor and politician (d. 2013)
  1954   – John Tory, Canadian lawyer and politician, 65th Mayor of Toronto
1955 – Laura Amy Schlitz, American author and librarian
1955 – Mark Howe, American ice hockey player and coach
1956 – Jerry Douglas, American guitarist and producer 
  1956   – Jeff Dujon, Jamaican cricketer 
  1956   – Markus Höttinger, Austrian racing driver (d. 1980)
  1956   – Peter Wilkinson, English admiral
1957 – Colin Barnes, English footballer
  1957   – Kirk Gibson, American baseball player and manager
  1957   – Ben Howland, American basketball player and coach
1959 – Risto Mannisenmäki, Finnish racing driver
1960 – Mark Sanford, American military veteran (USAF) and politician, 115th Governor of South Carolina
  1960   – Mary Portas, English journalist and author
1963 – Houman Younessi, Australian-American biologist and academic (d. 2016)
1964 – Jeff Fenech, Australian boxer and trainer
  1964   – Armen Gilliam, American basketball player and coach (d. 2011)
  1964   – Zsa Zsa Padilla, Filipino singer and actress 
  1964   – Phil Vassar, American singer-songwriter
1965 – Chris Ballew, American singer-songwriter and bass player 
  1965   – Mary Coughlan, Irish politician 
1966 – Roger Kumble, American director, screenwriter, and playwright
  1966   – Miljenko Jergović, Bosnian novelist and journalist
  1966   – Gavin Robertson, Australian cricketer
1967 – Glen Rice, American basketball player
1968 – Kylie Minogue, Australian singer-songwriter, producer, and actress
1969 – Mike DiFelice, American baseball player and manager
  1969   – Rob Ford, Canadian politician, 64th Mayor of Toronto (d. 2016)
1970 – Glenn Quinn, American actor (d. 2002)
1971 – Isabelle Carré, French actress and singer
  1971   – Ekaterina Gordeeva, Russian figure skater and sportscaster
  1971   – Marco Rubio, American lawyer and politician
1972 – Doriva, Brazilian footballer and manager
  1972   – Michael Boogerd, Dutch cyclist and manager
1973 – Marco Paulo Faria Lemos, Portuguese footballer and manager
1974 – Hans-Jörg Butt, German footballer
  1974   – Misbah-ul-Haq, Pakistani cricketer
  1975   – Maura Johnston, American journalist, critic, and academic
1976 – Steven Bell, Australian rugby league player
  1976   – Zaza Enden, Georgian-Turkish wrestler, basketball player, and coach
  1976   – Roberto Goretti, Italian footballer
  1976   – Glenn Morrison, Australian rugby league player and coach
1977 – Elisabeth Hasselbeck, American talk show host and author
1978 – Jake Johnson, American actor
1979 – Abdulaziz al-Omari, Saudi Arabian terrorist, hijacker of American Airlines Flight 11 (d. 2001)
  1979   – Ronald Curry, American football player and coach
1980 – Miguel Pérez, Spanish footballer
  1980   – Lucy Shuker, English tennis player
1981 – Daniel Cabrera, Dominican-American baseball player
  1981   – Eric Ghiaciuc, American football player
  1981   – Adam Green, American singer-songwriter and guitarist 
1982 – Alexa Davalos, French-American actress
  1982   – Jhonny Peralta, Dominican-American baseball player
1983 – Steve Cronin, American soccer player
  1983   – Humberto Sánchez, Dominican-American baseball player
  1983   – Roman Atwood,  American YouTube star
1985 – Colbie Caillat, American singer-songwriter and guitarist
  1985   – Pablo Andrés González, Argentinian footballer
  1985   – Kostas Mendrinos, Greek footballer
  1985   – Carey Mulligan, English actress and singer
1986 – Berrick Barnes, Australian rugby player
  1986   – Bryant Dunston, American-Armenian basketball player
  1986   – Seth Rollins, American wrestler
  1986   – Ingmar Vos, Dutch decathlete
1987 – T.J. Yates, American football player 
1988 – NaVorro Bowman, American football player
  1988   – Percy Harvin, American football player
  1988   – Craig Kimbrel, American baseball player
1990 – Kyle Walker, English footballer
1991 – Sharrif Floyd, American football player
  1991   – Alexandre Lacazette, French footballer 
  1991 – Danielle Lao, American tennis player 
  1991   – Kail Piho, Estonian skier
1993 – Daniel Alvaro, Australian rugby league player
  1993   – Bárbara Luz, Portuguese tennis player
1994 – John Stones, English footballer
1998 – Kim Dahyun, South Korean rapper and singer
1999 – Jodie Burrage, British tennis player
2000 – Phil Foden, English footballer
  2000   – Risi Pouri-Lane, New Zealand rugby sevens player

Deaths

Pre-1600
 576 – Germain of Paris, French bishop and saint (b. 496)
 741 – Ucha'an K'in B'alam, Mayan king 
 926 – Kong Qian, official of Later Tang
   926   – Li Jiji, prince of Later Tang
1023 – Wulfstan, English archbishop
1279 – William Wishart, Scottish bishop
1327 – Robert Baldock, Lord Privy Seal and Lord Chancellor of England
1357 – Afonso IV of Portugal (b. 1291)
1427 – Henry IV, Count of Holstein-Rendsburg (b. 1397)
1556 – Saitō Dōsan, Japanese samurai (b. 1494)

1601–1900
1626 – Thomas Howard, 1st Earl of Suffolk (b. 1561)
1651 – Henry Grey, 10th Earl of Kent, English politician (b. 1594)
1672 – John Trevor, Welsh politician, Secretary of State for the Northern Department (b. 1626)
1747 – Luc de Clapiers, marquis de Vauvenargues, French author (b. 1715)
1750 – Emperor Sakuramachi of Japan (b. 1720)
1787 – Leopold Mozart, Austrian violinist, composer, and conductor (b. 1719)
1805 – Luigi Boccherini, Italian cellist and composer (b. 1743)
1808 – Richard Hurd, English bishop (b. 1720)
1811 – Henry Dundas, 1st Viscount Melville, Scottish lawyer and politician, Secretary of State for War (b. 1742)
1831 – William Carnegie, 7th Earl of Northesk, Scottish-English admiral (b. 1756)
1843 – Noah Webster, American lexicographer (b. 1758)
1849 – Anne Brontë, English novelist and poet (b. 1820)
1864 – Simion Bărnuțiu, Romanian historian and politician (b. 1808)
1878 – John Russell, 1st Earl Russell, English politician, Prime Minister of the United Kingdom  (b. 1792)

1901–present
1904 – Kicking Bear, Native American tribal leader (b. 1846)
1916 – Ivan Franko, Ukrainian economist, journalist, and poet (b. 1856)
1927 – Boris Kustodiev, Russian painter and stage designer (b. 1878)
1937 – Alfred Adler, Austrian-Scottish ophthalmologist and psychologist (b. 1870)
1946 – Carter Glass, American publisher and politician, 47th United States Secretary of the Treasury (b. 1858)
1947 – August Eigruber, Austrian-German politician (b. 1907)
1952 – Philippe Desranleau, Canadian archbishop (b. 1882)
1953 – Tatsuo Hori, Japanese author and poet (b. 1904)
1964 – Terry Dillon, American football player (b. 1941)
1968 – Fyodor Okhlopkov, Russian sergeant and sniper (b. 1908)
1971 – Audie Murphy, American soldier and actor, Medal of Honor recipient (b. 1925)
1972 – Edward VIII of the United Kingdom (b. 1894)
1975 – Ezzard Charles, American boxer (b. 1921)
1976 – Zainul Abedin, Bangladeshi painter and sculptor (b. 1914)
1980 – Rolf Nevanlinna, Finnish mathematician and academic (b. 1895)
1981 – Mary Lou Williams, American pianist and composer (b. 1910)
  1981   – Stefan Wyszyński, Polish cardinal (b. 1901)
1982 – H. Jones, English colonel, Victoria Cross recipient (b. 1940)
1983 – Erastus Corning 2nd, American soldier and politician, 72nd Mayor of Albany (b. 1909)
1984 – Eric Morecambe, English actor and comedian (b. 1926)
1986 – Edip Cansever, Turkish poet and author (b. 1928)
1988 – Sy Oliver, American trumpet player, composer, and bandleader (b. 1910)
1990 – Julius Eastman, American composer (b. 1940)
1994 – Julius Boros, American golfer (b. 1920)
  1994   – Ely Jacques Kahn, Jr., American author and academic (b. 1916)
1998 – Phil Hartman, Canadian-American actor and comedian (b. 1948)
1999 – Michael Barkai, Israeli commander (b. 1935)
  1999   – B. Vittalacharya, Indian director and producer (b. 1920)
2000 – George Irving Bell, American physicist, biologist, and mountaineer (b. 1926)
2001 – Joe Moakley, American lawyer and politician (b. 1927)
  2001   – Francisco Varela, Chilean biologist and philosopher (b. 1946)
2002 – Mildred Benson, American journalist and author (b. 1905)
2003 – Oleg Grigoryevich Makarov, Russian engineer and astronaut (b. 1933)
  2003   – Ilya Prigogine, Russian-Belgian chemist and academic, Nobel Prize laureate (b. 1917)
  2003   – Martha Scott, American actress (b. 1912)
2004 – Michael Buonauro, American author and illustrator (b. 1979)
  2004   – John Tolos, Greek-Canadian wrestler (b. 1930)
2006 – Thorleif Schjelderup, Norwegian ski jumper and author (b. 1920)
2007 – Jörg Immendorff, German painter, sculptor, and academic (b. 1945)
  2007   – Toshikatsu Matsuoka, Japanese politician, Japanese Minister of Agriculture (b. 1945)
2008 – Beryl Cook, English painter and illustrator (b. 1926)
2010 – Gary Coleman, American actor (b. 1968)
2011 – Gino Valenzano, Italian racing driver (b. 1920)
2012 – Bob Edwards, English journalist (b. 1925)
  2012   – Yuri Susloparov, Ukrainian-Russian footballer and manager (b. 1958)
2013 – Viktor Kulikov, Russian commander (b. 1921)
  2013   – Eddie Romero, Filipino director, producer, and screenwriter (b. 1924)
  2013   – Gerd Schmückle, German general (b. 1917)
2014 – Maya Angelou, American memoirist and poet (b. 1928)
  2014   – Stan Crowther, English footballer (b. 1935)
  2014   – Oscar Dystel, American publisher (b. 1912)
  2014   – Malcolm Glazer, American businessman (b. 1928)
  2014   – Bob Houbregs, Canadian-American basketball player and manager (b. 1932)
  2014   – Isaac Kungwane, South African footballer (b. 1971)
2015 – Steven Gerber, American pianist and composer (b. 1948)
  2015   – Johnny Keating, Scottish trombonist, composer, and producer (b. 1927)
  2015   – Reynaldo Rey, American actor and screenwriter (b. 1940)
2018 – Neale Cooper, Scottish footballer (b. 1963)
  2018   – Jens Christian Skou, Danish medical doctor and Nobel Prize laureate (b. 1918)
  2018   – Cornelia Frances, English-Australian actress (b. 1941)
2021 – Mark Eaton, American basketball player (b. 1957)
2022 – Patricia Brake, English actress (b. 1942)

Holidays and observances
Armed Forces Day (Croatia)
Christian feast day:
Bernard of Menthon
Germain of Paris
John Calvin (Episcopal Church)
Lanfranc
Margaret Pole
William of Gellone
May 28 (Eastern Orthodox liturgics)
Downfall of the Derg (Ethiopia)
Flag Day (Philippines)
Menstrual Hygiene Day
Republic Day (Nepal)
TDFR Republic Day, celebrates the declaration of independence of the First Republic of Armenia and the Azerbaijan Democratic Republic from the Transcaucasian Democratic Federative Republic in 1918. (Azerbaijan and Armenia)
Youm-e-Takbir (Pakistan)

References

External links

 BBC: On This Day
 
 Historical Events on May 28

Days of the year
May